The Thyatirinae, or false owlet moths, are a subfamily of the moth family Drepanidae with about 200 species described. Until recently, most classifications treated this group as a separate family called Thyatiridae.

Taxonomy

References

 , 1973: A new genus and species of Ethiopian Thyatiridae (Lepidoptera). Journal of Natural History 7 (3): 267–272. Abstract: .
 , 2000: New Epipsestis Matsumura, 1921 species (Lepidoptera, Thyatiridae) from Vietnam and from Nepal. Acta Zoologica Academiae Scientiarum Hungaricae 46(4): 337–349.
 , 2000: Species of the genus Epipsestis Matsumura, 1921 in Taiwan, with the descriptions of three new taxa (Lepidoptera, Thyatiridae). Bulletin of the National Museum of Natural. Science 12: 75–92.
 , 2001: Taxonomic studies on the Eurasian Thyatiridae. Revision of Wernya Yoshimoto, 1987 generic complex and the genus Takapsestis Matsumura, 1933 (Lepidoptera). Acta Zoologica Academiae Scientiarum Hungaricae 47(1): 27–85.
 , 2007, Esperiana Buchreihe zur Entomologie Band 13: 1-683 
 , 1983: On a new genus for Polyploca nigripunctata Warren, 1915, with description of a new species from Taiwan (Lepidoptera: Thyatiridae). Tinea 11 (14): 125–132.

 
Moth subfamilies